Thomas Bradbury (born 27 February 1998) is an English professional footballer who plays for Cheltenham Town, as a central defender.

Career
Born in Aylesbury, Bradbury played youth football with Milton Keynes Dons, and in non-league football for Ware and Banbury United. He turned professional with Scottish club Dundee United in July 2018. He then played for York City, Yeovil Town and FC Halifax Town.

Bradbury signed for Cheltenham Town in June 2022, and scored his first EFL goal in a 3-0 away win against Peterborough United.

Career statistics

References

1998 births
Living people
English footballers
Milton Keynes Dons F.C. players
Ware F.C. players
Banbury United F.C. players
Dundee United F.C. players
York City F.C. players
Yeovil Town F.C. players
FC Halifax Town players
Cheltenham Town F.C. players
Association football defenders
Isthmian League players
Southern Football League players
National League (English football) players
English Football League players